Human Rights Internet (HRI) is a non-governmental organization based in Ottawa, Ontario, Canada, supporting the exchange of information within the worldwide human rights community.

It was co-founded by the political scientist Laurie S. Wiseberg (then at the University of Illinois at Chicago Circle), who typed the first issue of its newsletter and mailed it to about 100 people, mostly social scientists and legal scholars studying human rights. Launched in 1976 under the name InterNet: the International Human Rights Documentation Network, the organization employed the term InterNet six years before the Internet protocol suite (TCP/IP) was introduced as the standard networking protocol on the ARPANET, the precursor to the modern Internet. Originally the organization employed the term to refer to the concept of an international network of human rights organizations.

Over the years HRI has worked with several governmental, intergovernmental and non-governmental actors to collect and disseminate human rights information, to stimulate reflections and discussions on human rights. Today, HRI is working to build an online space where individuals and organizations can access current human rights information and resources; to inspire education, advocacy and dialogue in Canada and beyond.

Held at the University of Connecticut's Archives and Special Collections in the Thomas J. Dodd Research Center, the Laurie S. Wiseberg and Harry Scoble Human Rights Internet Collection consists of 343 linear feet of newsletters, reports, correspondence, ephemera, and other materials collected from human rights non-governmental organizations.

References

External links
 Human Rights Internet

Human rights organizations based in Canada
Non-profit organizations based in Ottawa
Organizations established in 1976